McPherson is a city in and the county seat of McPherson County, Kansas, United States.  As of the 2020 census, the population of the city was 14,082.  The city is named after Union General James Birdseye McPherson, a Civil War general. It is home to McPherson College and Central Christian College.

History

19th century

For millennia, the land now known as Kansas was inhabited by Native Americans.  In 1803, most of modern Kansas was secured by the United States as part of the Louisiana Purchase.  In 1854, the Kansas Territory was organized, then in 1861 Kansas became the 34th U.S. state.  In 1867, McPherson County was founded.

McPherson was founded in 1872 by the twelve members of the McPherson Town Company. In 1887, city officials began a failed attempt to have the community named the state capital.

The first post office in McPherson was established in 1873. McPherson was incorporated as a city in 1874.

As early as 1875, city leaders of Marion held a meeting to consider a branch railroad from Florence.  In 1878, Atchison, Topeka and Santa Fe Railway and parties from Marion County and McPherson County chartered the Marion and McPherson Railway Company.  In 1879, a branch line was built from Florence to McPherson. In 1880 it was extended to Lyons and in 1881 it was extended to Ellinwood.  The line was leased and operated by the Atchison, Topeka and Santa Fe Railway.  The line from Florence to Marion, was abandoned in 1968.  In 1992, the line from Marion to McPherson was sold to Central Kansas Railway. In 1993, after heavy flood damage, the line from Marion to McPherson was abandoned.  The original branch line connected Florence, Marion, Canada, Hillsboro, Lehigh, Canton, Galva, McPherson, Conway, Windom, Little River, Mitchell, Lyons, Chase, Ellinwood.

In 1887, the Chicago, Kansas and Nebraska Railway built a main line from Herington through McPherson to Pratt.  In 1888, this line was extended to Liberal.  Later, it was extended to Tucumcari, New Mexico and El Paso, Texas.  It foreclosed in 1891 and taken over by Chicago, Rock Island and Pacific Railway, which shut down in 1980 and reorganized as Oklahoma, Kansas and Texas Railroad, merged in 1988 with Missouri Pacific Railroad, merged in 1997 with Union Pacific Railroad.  Most locals still refer to this railroad as the "Rock Island".

By 1888, the community was at the junction of four railroad lines. Major industries have included a large flour mill, an insurance company headquarters, and an oil refinery.

20th century

The National Old Trails Road, also known as the Ocean-to-Ocean Highway, was established in 1912, and was routed through Windom, Conway and McPherson.

In the 1930s, the local refinery sponsored the McPherson Globe Refiners basketball team (AAU). They were coached by Gene Johnson, former head coach of Wichita University (now Wichita State University). The Refiners were best known for their tall centers, Joe Fortenberry (6-8) and Willard Schmidt (6-9) and their fast-break style of play. Billed as "The Tallest Team in the World", the Refiners often held their opponents to low scores because of the centers' ability to deflect shots on the way to the basket in what today would be called goaltending. Coach Johnson was one of the innovators of the fast break and full-court press. The Refiners won the AAU national championship in 1936 against the Hollywood Universal team. This earned them the right to compete for the first ever USA Olympic basketball team in 1936. Hollywood Universal narrowly beat the Refiners at Madison Square Garden and the USA team was composed of both Universal and Refiners players and one college student. Coach Johnson was selected to be the assistant coach. After a long journey by boat to Europe, the team played in alternating squads at the Olympics. The Refiners' portion of the team took the court to defeat Canada 19–8 in the gold medal game on August 14, 1936 at the Summer Olympics. The Refiners' home court is now the McPherson Community Building at 121 East Marlin and can be toured by contacting the local Convention and Visitors Bureau. A mural in honor of the Refiners was completed in 2010 at the intersection of Kansas and Ash, south of their home court in preparation for the 75th anniversary celebration of their victory in 2011.

Geography
McPherson is located at  (38.371923, −97.662177).

The community is located on U.S. Route 56, just west of Interstate 135. McPherson is part of the Little Arkansas River Watershed that ultimately empties into the Arkansas River in Wichita. Dry Turkey Creek is a wet weather stream that composes several enhanced lakes within the city limits. It feeds the Lakeside Park Lagoon before crossing under East Euclid Street and Kansas Avenue, where it then forms Wall Park Lake.

South and west of town are four units of the reclaimed McPherson Valley Wetlands, acquired and managed by Kansas Department of Wildlife and Parks, Ducks Unlimited, and the U.S. Fish and Wildlife Service. Prior to 1880, this natural wetlands was an important waterfowl and wildlife habitat second only to Cheyenne Bottoms in importance to migratory bird populations. These wetlands continue to see improvement and development.

Climate
The climate in this area is characterized by hot, humid summers and generally mild to cool winters.  According to the Köppen Climate Classification system, McPherson has a humid subtropical climate, abbreviated "Cfa" on climate maps.

Area events
 Scottish Festival & Highland Games were held on the fourth weekend of September of each year. They are discontinued as of 2017.

Demographics

2010 census
As of the census of 2010, there were 13,155 people, 5,521 households, and 3,534 families living in the city. The racial makeup of the city was 93.2% White, 1.5% African American, 0.4% Native American, 0.8% Asian, 0.1% Pacific Islander, 1.8% from other races, and 2.2% from two or more races. Hispanic or Latino of any race were 4.8% of the population.

There were 5,521 households, of which 29.8% had children under the age of 18 living with them, 52.5% were married couples living together, 8.0% had a female householder with no husband present, 3.5% had a male householder with no wife present, and 36.0% were non-families. 30.8% of all households were made up of individuals, and 12.5% had someone living alone who was 65 years of age or older. The average household size was 2.35 and the average family size was 2.94.

The median age in the city was 38.5 years. 24.4% of residents were under the age of 18; 8.8% were between the ages of 18 and 24; 23.7% were from 25 to 44; 26.5% were from 45 to 64; and 16.5% were 65 years of age or older. The gender makeup of the city was 49.4% male and 50.6% female.

2000 census
As of the census of 2000, there were 13,770 people, 5,378 households, and 3,651 families living in the city. The racial makeup of the city was 95.11% White, 1.31% African American, 0.36% Native American, 0.41% Asian, 0.09% Pacific Islander, 1.21% from other races, and 1.50% from two or more races. Hispanic or Latino of any race were 2.92% of the population.

There were 5,378 households, out of which 32.6% had children under the age of 18 living with them, 57.7% were married couples living together, 7.2% had a female householder with no husband present, and 32.1% were non-families. 27.8% of all households were made up of individuals, and 11.7% had someone living alone who was 65 years of age or older. The average household size was 2.43 and the average family size was 2.97.

In the city, the population was spread out, with 25.6% under the age of 18, 11.6% from 18 to 24, 26.4% from 25 to 44, 20.8% from 45 to 64, and 15.7% who were 65 years of age or older. The median age was 36 years. For every 100 females, there were 94.3 males. For every 100 females age 18 and over, there were 91.6 males.

The median income for a household in the city was $40,469, and the median income for a family was $48,882. Males had a median income of $33,831 versus $20,633 for females. The per capita income for the city was $19,716. About 5.1% of families and 7.9% of the population were below the poverty line, including 4.8% of those under age 18 and 9.4% of those age 65 or over.

Education

Higher education
McPherson College and Central Christian College are located in McPherson.

Primary and secondary education
The community is served by McPherson USD 418 public school district.  USD 418 has an Early Childhood center, four elementary schools (Eisenhower, Lincoln, Rosevelt, Washington), McPherson Middle School and McPherson High School. McPherson's mascot is the Bullpups. Additionally, private school options are available at St. Joseph Catholic Church & School, serving students through sixth grade.

Transportation
McPherson was located on the National Old Trails Road, also known as the Ocean-to-Ocean Highway, that was established in 1912.

Bus service is provided daily towards Wichita and Salina by BeeLine Express (subcontractor of Greyhound Lines).

Media

Print
McPherson has a daily newspaper, The McPherson Sentinel. and a weekly newspaper, The McPherson Weekly News,

Radio
The following radio stations are licensed to McPherson:

AM

FM

Notable people

 Anna Larkin, folk sculptor, lived in McPherson for many years until her death.
V. John Krehbiel, Ambassador to Finland
 George Magerkurth, Major League Baseball umpire, born in McPherson.
 Brad Underwood, basketball coach at University of Illinois, McPherson native.
 Sue Raney, jazz singer

See also
 List of people from McPherson County, Kansas
 National Register of Historic Places listings in McPherson County, Kansas
 Santa Fe Trail
 National Old Trails Road
 Threshing Stone
 List of oil pipelines
 List of oil refineries

References

Further reading

 McPherson, Kansas: Past and Present, Progress and Prosperity; Freeman Publishing Co.
 McPherson at Fifty - A Kansas Community in 1920s; Raymond L. Flory; McPherson College; 1970.
 Diamond Jubilee McPherson, 1872-1947: Pioneer Days in McPherson; Jessie Hill Rowland; 1947.
 A History of the Church of the Brethren in Kansas (includes McPherson College history); Elmer LeRoy Craik; McPherson Daily; Republican Press; 397 pages; 1922.
 Major General James B. McPherson Monument Unveiling; Alex S. Hendry; 1917.
 Our Railroad; McPherson Independent; September 25, 1879.

External links

 
 McPherson - Directory of Public Officials, League of Kansas Municipalities
 McPherson – Chamber of Commerce
 Historic Images of McPherson, Special Photo Collections at Wichita State University Library
 , from Hatteberg's People on KAKE TV news
 McPherson city map, KDOT

Cities in Kansas
County seats in Kansas
Cities in McPherson County, Kansas
Micropolitan areas of Kansas
Populated places established in 1872
1872 establishments in Kansas